Daniela Adrija Vismane (born 10 August 2000) is a tennis player from Latvia. She is a member of the Latvia Fed Cup team and has a win–loss record in Fed Cup competition of 3–9. On the ITF Circuit, she has won three singles and three doubles titles. She has career-high rankings of 228 in singles and 208 in doubles by the Women's Tennis Association (WTA).

Junior career

Grand Slam performance
Singles:
 Australian Open: QF (2018)
 French Open: 2R (2017, 2018)
 Wimbledon: 1R (2017, 2018)
 US Open: 1R (2017)

Doubles:
 Australian Open: –
 French Open: 1R (2017)
 Wimbledon: QF (2017)
 US Open: –

Career

She made her ITF Circuit debut in May 2015 as a qualifier at the $10k tournament of Puszczykowo. 

In March 2018, she reached her first semifinal at the $15k event in Mâcon, and then in July was advanced to her first final at the $15k Pärnu. In the final, she defeated Angelina Zhuravleva in three sets. A month later, she won her first doubles title at the $15k Budapest tournament, alongside Petra Januskova. 

She started season of 2019 with semifinal at the $15k Stuttgart, followed up then with final of the $15k Antalya. In July, she reached her first $25k-level final in Jerusalem but lost to Jodie Burrage. Two months later, at the Baltic Open in Jūrmala, she had her first attempt for debuting at the WTA Tour but lost in qualifying. She finished year with title at the $15k event in Heraklion, after defeating Darya Astakhova. 

In May 2021, she won her first $25k-level tournament in Liepāja, defeating Malene Helgø in the final.

Grand Slam performance

Singles

ITF Circuit finals

Singles: 6 (3 titles, 3 runner–ups)

Doubles: 10 (3 titles, 7 runner–ups)

References

External links
 
 
 

2000 births
Living people
Latvian female tennis players
Tennis players at the 2018 Summer Youth Olympics